The Reese's 200 is a , 200-lap annual ARCA Menards Series race held at Lucas Oil Indianapolis Raceway Park in Brownsburg, Indiana. The inaugural event was held on June 19, 1971 and was won by Ramo Stott. The race has been run each year since 2011 except for 2013 and 2021.

History

ARCA debuted at the track in 1971, when it ran for two years consecutively, and once more in 1974. The race returned again in 1983, when it ran for three consecutive years with a second race in 1985. The track remained off the schedule until 2011, when it was added back to the schedule. The race would again go on hiatus for the 2013 season, but returned in 2014. Calypso Lemonade became the title sponsor of the race in 2020. The race was taken off the schedule in 2021 but added back on in 2022 and Reese's became the title sponsor of the race that year.

Past winners

Notes 
2011: "Race extended to 203 laps due to green/white/checker."
2019: "Race shortened to 167 laps due to rain."

Multiple winners (drivers)

Multiple winners (teams)

Manufacturer wins

References

External links
 

ARCA Menards Series races
ARCA Menards Series
Motorsport in Indiana
Annual sporting events in the United States
NASCAR races at Lucas Oil Raceway at Indianapolis